Kallang Airport (also known as the Kallang Aerodrome, Kallang Airfield and RAF Kallang) was the first purpose-built civil international airport in Singapore, opened officially on 12 June 1937 and ceased operations in 1955, when it was relocated to Paya Lebar. Situated on the eastern shore of the Kallang Basin, the Kallang Airport spanned the modern planning areas of Kallang and Geylang at its greatest extent. The conserved complex, including the airport's terminal building, is located wholly within Kallang.

Boasting an anchorage area for seaplanes along the airport's perimeter on the Kallang Basin, the Kallang Airport was hailed as "the finest airport in the British Empire" at that time. Famous aviator Amelia Earhart once described it as "an aviation miracle of the East".

It resulted in the displacement of a large Malay community to the area around Jalan Eunos. Three Hawker Osprey aircraft first touched down in the Kallang Airport around two years before its official opening, on 21 November 1935. During World War II, the Kallang Airport was the only operational airfield in Singapore capable of supporting Allied campaigns against the Japanese forces. As early as 1950, plans were made to build a new airport at Paya Lebar (the current Paya Lebar Air Base) as the Kallang Airport was unable to cope with the increase in air traffic despite being expanded. The Kallang Airport finally closed in 1955.

The Kallang Airport compound was subsequently occupied by several organisations following its decommissioning, the most notable being the People's Association which used the facility as its headquarters from 1960 to 2009. While most parts of the airport were demolished soon after its closure, numerous structures remain. The structures which were gazetted for conservation by the Urban Redevelopment Authority on 5 December 2008 include the airport's terminal building, administrative blocks, aircraft hangars and control tower. The conserved complex is currently unoccupied.

Other parts of the Kallang Airport were redeveloped. The area surrounding the airport's former runway was first converted into the Kallang Park, a large public park created as part of "Project Lung"; later, the old National Stadium was built on the same site; today, the Singapore Sports Hub (including the new National Stadium and Singapore Indoor Stadium) is a major national landmark. The eastern portion of the Kallang Airport was redeveloped into one of Singapore's first modern residential precinct, now called the "Old Kallang Airport Estate".

It was one of the locations that hosted the 2011 Singapore Biennale art festival. There are plans to transform the Kallang Airport area into a commercial hub, along with the adjacent Kallang riverside.

Today, roads like Old Airport Road, Kallang Airport Drive, Kallang Airport Way directly reference the Kallang Airport; Old Terminal Lane refers to the conserved Kallang Airport terminal building; Dakota Crescent, Dakota Close and Dakota MRT station are named after the Douglas DC-3 "Dakota" aircraft that used to land frequently at the Kallang Airport and serve to commemorate an aviation disaster in 1946.

History

Naming
Kallang Airport got its name from the nearby Kallang Basin, which was named after a group of sea-gypsies living around the area in the 1800s.

On 11 February 1930, the Dutch Airline KLM operated the first service flight between Amsterdam and Batavia (now Jakarta), landing at Seletar with a Dutch-made Fokker trimotor monoplane carrying 8 passengers and a cargo of fresh fruit, flowers and mail. This marked the beginning of commercial civil aviation in Singapore. KLM later introduced a regular Amsterdam to Batavia flight service in late 1931.

Two years later, in July 1933, Imperial Airways, the flagship airline of the British empire at the time, started a service between London and Darwin via Cairo, Karachi, Calcutta, Singapore and Jakarta. This service was later extended to Brisbane and operated jointly with Qantas on 17 December 1934.

Booming commercial aviation traffic led to congestion at the existing Seletar Airbase (today's Seletar Airport), creating a need for a new airport. On 31 August 1931, Sir Cecil Clementi, Governor of the Straits Settlements, announced that Kallang Basin as the location for the new civil aerodrome suitable for land planes and seaplanes, and relieving Seletar of commercial flight activities. This place was chosen over other possible sites because of its proximity to the city centre as well as its location next to the Kallang Basin, which allowed seaplanes to land.

Construction
Reclamation work began on the 103 hectares of a tidal swamp in Kallang Basin in 1932. Seven million cubic metres of earth were used for the filling of this tidal swamp. By 1936, all reclamation and consolidation of land were completed, forming a 915-metre diameter, dome-shaped landing ground.

On 12 June 1937, the Kallang Aerodrome was officially opened by Sir Shenton Thomas, who had taken over the governorship of the Straits Settlements from Sir Cecil in 1934. At the time it was hailed as "the finest airport in the British Empire", with facilities that were considered revolutionary. The circular aerodrome allowed planes to land from any direction, and the slipway allowed seaplanes to be served at the same terminal building as regular planes.

World War II
When the Japanese launched their invasion of Malaya and Singapore on 8 December 1941, Kallang was the principal fighter airfield. By January 1942, it was the only operational fighter airfield in Singapore, as the other airfields (Tengah, Seletar and Sembawang) were within range of Japanese artillery at Johor Bahru.

Brewster Buffalo fighters of 243 Squadron RAF, 488 Squadron RNZAF and a detachment of 2-VLG-V of the Royal Netherlands East Indies Air Force operated from the airfield, defending Singapore from repeated Japanese air raids. They were joined later by Hawker Hurricanes of 232 Squadron RAF, but attrition took a steady toll on men and machines, and by the last days of January 1942, the airfield had been badly damaged by the bombing and only a small number of aircraft were serviceable. The last of the fighters left in early February, escaping to carry on the fight just before Singapore was surrendered to the advancing Japanese.

Air Headquarters Malaya Communication Squadron RAF was formed here.

The war years and after
The growth in aviation traffic was stunted during the war years, a period which saw the landing circle being converted into a single runway to allow use by warplanes. The British Overseas Airways Corporation (BOAC) and Qantas resumed their regular services to the airport, while the resurrected local airline Malayan Airways (MAL) began services on 1 May 1947.

In the early 1950s, the increasing size of aircraft and the need for longer runways resulted in it being extended beyond Mountbatten Road in the eastern boundary of the facility into what is now Old Airport Road. This necessitated the installation of traffic lights to halt vehicular traffic every time a plane took off or landed.

Photo gallery

Former airlines and destinations

Accidents and incidents
 On 7 November 1941, a Royal Air Force Tiger Moth piloted by Flight Lieutenant Alec Wills was hit from behind by a landing Buffalo of 243 Squadron, resulting in Wills' death. 
 On 29 June 1946, one of the Dakota aircraft belonging to the Royal Air Force Police with 20 NCOs on board crashed at the airport in a storm with no survivors.
 On 13 March 1954, a BOAC Lockheed Constellation, G-ALAM Belfast carrying mail crashed while attempting to land at Kallang Airport en route to London from Sydney. The accident killed 32 people, including eight crew members. An investigation of the incident found that the most probable cause of the crash was pilot fatigue, but there was a serious problem of "inadequate response of the fire and rescue services". This remains the worst flight disaster in Singapore.

Legacy
Kallang Airport has left several reminders of its existence. The old runway near to Mountbatten Road is now called Old Airport Road. The surrounding public flats there are named the Old Kallang Airport Estate. The estate is served by Dakota MRT station, which took its name from the Dakota DC-3 aircraft which used to land at the Kallang Airport.

Two new roads near Kallang MRT station have been named "Kallang Airport Drive" and "Kallang Airport Way". In addition, Old Terminal Lane, which links Geylang Road with Kallang Airport Way, references the Kallang Airport's conserved terminal building.

The slipway for seaplanes was occupied by the Oasis Building, a structure built on the Kallang Basin. The terminal building itself was used as the headquarters of the People's Association until 9 April 2009, when it moved to its new headquarters at King George's Avenue. The PA building held many activities for the ruling People's Action Party, ranging from school visits to social events.

Kallang Airport was gazetted for conservation on 5 December 2008 by the Urban Redevelopment Authority (URA) of Singapore.

Architecture  
The original Terminal Building is an iconic modernist building with Art Deco-style railings and columns by Frank Dorrington Ward. The international style also be interpreted in this building as a radical simplification of form, refusing  of ornament, using transparent materials and making building visually lighter, also the clearly division of functions. There is a circular elevated glass control tower centrally and two side blocks that composed the former terminal building with an open-air viewing deck on the top floor. The People's Association kept the concrete structure and transparent glazed walls and repaired the façade, closed the gates and rebuilt the window on the second floor to reorganize the interior space for office.

See also

Battle of Singapore
Far East Air Force (Royal Air Force)
Former Overseas RAF bases

References

Citations

Bibliography

External links
History of RAF

Airports in Singapore
Defunct airports
Kallang
Military of Singapore under British rule
World War II sites in Singapore
Airports established in 1937
1937 establishments in Singapore
1955 disestablishments in Singapore
20th-century architecture in Singapore